Long Merarap is a settlement in the Lawas division of Sarawak, Malaysia.

On 4 May 1963 a Belvedere helicopter crashed near the village of Long Merarap in the Trusan Valley. A patrol from 22 SAS searched for survivors; they found the wreck, but all nine men on the helicopter were dead. The casualties were: Flight-Lieutenant A.P.J. Dodson (RAF), Flight-Lieutenant D.R.E. Viner (RAF), Corporal (Tech) J.L. Williams (RAF), Major H.A.I. Thompson MC (RHF & 22 SAS), Major R.H.D. Norman MBE (Para & 22 SAS), Corporal M.P. Murphy (Para and 22 SAS), Captain J. Conington (RF and 22 SAS), M.H. Day (Foreign Office) and D. Reddish (The Borneo Company).

Neighbouring settlements include:

References

Villages in Sarawak